Kerry Devon Blackshear Sr. (born November 12, 1973) is an American retired professional basketball player. He played college basketball at Stetson.

Blackshear was the oldest of nine siblings. He attended Fort Pierce Central High School. Blackshear did not play competitive basketball until 1990, picking up the game after his mother died. He was discovered by Stetson assistant coach Frank Burnell, who saw him play a junior varsity game. At the time, Blackshear was considering enlisting in the army, but instead went to Stetson, choosing the Hatters over offers from McNeese State, Queens College, and Chipola Junior College.

Blackshear was named Trans America Athletic Conference Newcomer of the Year after his freshman season at Stetson. He averaged 17 points and 5.6 rebounds per game as a sophomore. Blackshear's season ended in February 1994, when he broke a metatarsal bone in his foot. As a junior, he averaged 20.4 points and 6.8 rebounds per game. Blackshear was named to the First Team All-TAAC and TAAC Player of the Year. He averaged 16 points per game as a senior, though the team finished 10–17. Blackshear finished his career with 1,826 points, second all-time in Stetson history, as well as 643 rebounds (14th in program history), 170 three-pointers (fourth) and 152 steals (fifth).

After graduation, Blackshear was drafted by the Treasure Coast Tropics of the United States Basketball League. He played professionally in several countries in Europe and South America. He married Lamilia Ford, whom he met while they both played basketball at Stetson. Their son Kerry Jr. is also a professional basketball player. As of 2015, the elder Blackshear works as a manager in the Orlando parks and recreation department. He was inducted into Stetson's Hall of Fame in 2002.

References

External links
Stetson Hatters bio

1973 births
Living people
American expatriate basketball people in Argentina
American expatriate basketball people in Chile
American expatriate basketball people in the Dominican Republic
American expatriate basketball people in Germany
American expatriate basketball people in Spain
American expatriate basketball people in Venezuela
American men's basketball players
Basketball players from Orlando, Florida
Stetson Hatters men's basketball players
Small forwards